The Newarke Houses Museum is a public museum in Leicester, England. It incorporates the museum of the Royal Leicestershire Regiment, and has a range of exhibits illustrating post-medieval and contemporary Leicester. The museum is close to the 15th century Magazine Gateway and within the precincts of the medieval 'Newarke', the 'New Work' of Henry of Grosmont, 1st Duke of Lancaster. The museum stands in the middle of the De Montfort University campus.

History

The museum occupies two buildings: Wyggeston's Chantry House (built circa 1511), and Thomas Skeffington's Skeffington House (built in the seventeenth century). The houses were used during the Siege of Leicester in 1645 as part of the English Civil War. The two properties were sold in 1908 and, while Chantry House remained a private residence, Skeffington House became a school for boys. Both properties were acquired and converted for museum use in 1953 as part of the celebrations surrounding the coronation of the Queen. One room on the ground floor of the museum represents the buildings' 17th Century interior.

Collections
Possessions on display include items of clothing and his chair.

The museum also houses a 1950s Leicester street scene modelled in Wharf Street with a number of model shops, as well as an exhibition of toys from Tudor times to the present.

Other collections relate to Leicester's industrial and hosiery industry, such as Corah's and Wolsey, major clothing firms in Leicester. The museum has an exhibit with a particularly focus on the more recent history of Leicester, from the 19th century onward.

During the period 2014 to 2018 it held a rolling series of exhibitions marking the centenary of the First World War entitled 'Leicester Remembers'. The museum also includes a display about the Royal Leicestershire Regiment, such as drums used by the regiment band, and a tiger, the mascot of the regiment. The museum houses a large collection of items relating to life during the wars. These cover aspects of the front-line and home front. The museum holds a large collection of medals, with records regarding the involvement of people within the Leicester Regiment, which can be accessed via a computer. A model trench sits on the first floor. Other items include a Morrison Shelter and gas masks to reflect the Home Front during the Second World War.

Gardens
The gardens of the museum are laid out on separate sides of the main building which has an extension into the garden. These are laid to box hedges in medieval style maze-like geometric patterns. The garden was stocked in Victorian times with a variety of exotic trees and other plants, several of which survive to the present day. The end wall of the garden has gun loops, cut in it by Cromwell's troops, the Round-heads, in 1645 during the English Civil War when the Cavalier Prince Rupert was besieging the town.

See also
Jewry Wall Museum
New Walk Museum
Abbey Pumping Station
Leicester Guildhall
Also, List of museums in Leicestershire

References

External links 

 Newarke Houses Museum website
 

Museums in Leicester
History of Leicester
Local museums in Leicestershire
Regimental museums in England